Li Jinyu (born 30 January 2001 in Heilongjiang) is a female Chinese short track speed skater. Most notably, she competed at the 2018 Winter Olympics for China.

References

2001 births
Living people
Chinese female speed skaters
Chinese female short track speed skaters
Short track speed skaters at the 2018 Winter Olympics
Olympic short track speed skaters of China
Medalists at the 2018 Winter Olympics
Olympic silver medalists for China
Olympic medalists in short track speed skating
Sportspeople from Heilongjiang
World Short Track Speed Skating Championships medalists
21st-century Chinese women